The Battle for the Bell is an American college football rivalry game played by the Marshall Thundering Herd football team of Marshall University and the Ohio Bobcats football team of Ohio University. It is a regional rivalry, with the universities' campuses located about 80 miles (130 km) from each other, with a bell awarded as the trophy for the winner of the game. While Marshall and Ohio first played in 1905, they did not start playing for "The Bell" until 1997 when Marshall rejoined the Mid-American Conference. With Marshall's move from the MAC to Conference USA in 2005, the rivalry game was on hiatus for several years.  The series unexpectedly resumed in 2009 when the Herd and Bobcats faced off in the 2009 Little Caesars Pizza Bowl, which Marshall won 21–17.  A six-year contract between the schools began in 2010. The six-year series contract between the two schools was not renewed following the 2015 season. The rivalry resumed in the 2019 season, with additional games scheduled for the 2025 and 2027 seasons. Ohio leads the all-time series over Marshall 33–21–6.

Series overview

Game results

See also  
 List of NCAA college football rivalry games

References

Sources

External links
 Ohio to play MU in 2010
 All-Time series History

College football rivalries in the United States
Marshall Thundering Herd football
Ohio Bobcats football